Ekma Assembly constituency is an assembly constituency in Saran district in the Indian state of Bihar.

Overview
As per Delimitation of Parliamentary and Assembly constituencies Order, 2008, No. 113 Ekma Assembly constituency is composed of the following: Ekma and Lahladpur community development blocks; Mohmmadpur, Bhajouna Nachap, atarsan  ashahni, nawada, Bhalua Bujurg, Mobarakpur, Matiyar, Chephul and Gobrahi gram panchayats of Manjhi CD Block, Parsagarh Dakshani, Uttari and Puri of Ekma Block.

Ekma Assembly constituency is part of No. 19 Maharajganj (Lok Sabha constituency).  It has a railway station.

Members of Vidhan Sabha

Election results

2020

References

External links
 

Assembly constituencies of Bihar
Politics of Saran district